Karwar railway division is one of the two railway divisions under Konkan Railway of Indian Railways. This railway division was formed on 26 January 1998 and its headquarter is located at Karwar in the state of Karnataka of India.

Ratnagiri railway division is another railway division under Konkan Railway headquartered at Mumbai. Karwar railway region extends over 660 kilometres (410 mi) from Pernem in Goa to Surathkal in Karnataka. Railway Regions are headed by a Regional Railway Manager.

References

 
Divisions of Konkan Railway
Divisions of Indian Railways
1998 establishments in Karnataka